Long Day Good Night is the thirteenth studio album by American progressive metal band Fates Warning, released on November 6, 2020. It is Fates Warning's first release on Metal Blade Records since 2004's FWX and also the first to feature guitarist Mike Abdow, who joined in 2017.

Background
On February 15, 2019, it was announced that Fates Warning had re-signed to Metal Blade Records, and were planning to work on their thirteenth studio album for a 2020 release. In a December 2019 interview, bassist Joey Vera stated, "Fates Warning is not quite done writing, but pretty close. I think that the Fates record is also gonna be recording probably around January, February. I'm still very involved in both of those bands, obviously. So, for sure, a new Armored Saint record and a new Fates Warning record is on the horizon in the next 18 months, for sure." On May 13, 2020, Alder announced on his Instagram profile that his vocals for the album were finished.

On August 25, 2020, details of Fates Warning's thirteenth studio album were released, including the title, release date and track listing, and its lead single "Scars" was released on the same day.

Track listing

Personnel
Ray Alder – lead vocals
Jim Matheos – guitars
Joey Vera – bass, backing vocals
Bobby Jarzombek – drums
Mike Abdow – guitar solos on Shuttered World, The Way Home & The Longest Shadow of the Day.

Guest musicians
Gavin Harrison – drums on When Snow Falls
Mika Posen – violin on Under the Sun
Raphael Weinroth-Browne – cello on Under the Sun
George Hideous – bass on When Snow Falls & The Last Song

Charts

References

Fates Warning albums
2020 albums
Metal Blade Records albums